Artzi may refer to:

 Netanel Artzi (born 1997), Israeli basketball player
 Shlomo Artzi (born 1949), Israeli folk rock singer-songwriter and composer
 Yitzhak Artzi (1920–2003), Israel politician
 Arce, Spain (spelled Artzi in Basque), a town

See also
 Shmuel Ben-Artzi (1914–2011), Israeli writer, poet and educator, and father-in-law of Israeli Prime Minister Benjamin Netanyahu